Pannipitiya is a suburb of Colombo. Pannipitiya is subdivided into a number of smaller areas.

Areas in Pannipitiya

Pannipitiya Junction - Junction which connects the Borella Road with the Old Road. The Pannipitiya post office and train station are situated here. There is a cross road from Pannipitiya town that connects it to the High Level Road (A4) which is running close by. Pannipitiya junction is on the westernmost part of Pannipitiya area. Maharagama area starts just 1 km away from Pannipitiya junction towards Colombo.
This junction is connected to Erewwala junction on one side and to Old Kottawa Road on the other side. Maharagama-Sikurada Pola (Route No. 297) and Maharagama-Erewwala (Route No.212) operate through here. Pannipitiya Dharmapala College is situated near this junction.
Kottawa is in the centre of Pannipitiya area geographically and also this is the biggest town in Pannipitiya area. Most of the area's financial centres, shopping centres and banks are located here. And also this is the main bus terminus in the area. The junction connects Kottawa-Horana, Kottawa-Mount Lavinia, Kottawa-Pannipitiya, Kottawa-Malabe, Kottawa-Athurugiriya-Rukmalgama and Highlevel (Pettah-Maharagama-Kottawa-Homagama-Awissawella) roads together. There are bus services to nearby cities - Piliyandala (Route No-296,342), Mt.Lavinia (Route No-255), Malabe (Route No-336), Kiriwaththuduwa / Yakahaluwa / Thalagala  (Route No-128), Moragahahena (Route No-129), Horana (Route No-280 - from Maharagama),  Mattegoda (Route No-138/2 - From Pettah), Rukmalgama (Route No-138/3 - from Pettah), Athurugiriya (Route No-138/4 - From Pettah) - and also to Colombo - Pettah (Route No-138), Borella (Route No-174). There is also a police station at Kottawa. Although Kottawa is inside Pannipitiya postal area there is a separate post office opened at Kottawa town few years ago. There is also a railway station at Kottawa. The town is maintained by the Maharagama Urban Council.
This is the easternmost area of Pannipitiya towards Homagama on High Level Road. The next area is called Galawilawaththa, which is under Homagama.The Kottawa interchange of the E02 Expressway is located here.
Arawwala - Three-way junction (and nearby area) situated on the Maharagama-Piliyandala road. This junction is connected to Moraketiya junction by the Erewwala Road. (Pettah-)Maharagama-Erewwala(-Bokundara) (Route No.212) buses operate through Erewwala Road. Although Erewwala is inside Pannipitiya area the most easily accessible cities from Erewwala are Maharagama and Piliyandala. Maharagama-Piliyandala (Route No-341) buses operate through Erewwala. This is the southwesternmost area in Pannipitiya. Beyond here there is Piliyandala area to the south and Maharagama area to the west and north-west.
Ambagas-hathara - Sinhalese meaning of "Ambagas-hathra" is "four mango trees". This name must have originated by the mango trees that had grown near this junction some time back. Maharagama-Vidyala junction (Route No.990) buses operate through here.
Polwaththa/Kalalgoda - Sinhalese meaning of "Polwaththa" is "Coconut Estate", although there is no major coconut vegetation nearby. This is the northwesternmost border of Pannipitiya. Beyond here on the area is under Thalawathugoda. Kottawa-Borella (Route No-174) buses operates through this area.
Can be accessed from Kottawa junction from the other side through Kottawa-Malabe Road.
Vidyala Junction - Sinhalese meaning of "Vidyala" is "School", since there is a school nearby. This is a three-way junction which connects to Moraketiya, Kottawa and Malabe. This is the border of Pannipitiya on the Moraketiya-Malabe Road (better known as Maharagama-Malabe Road). This is the northernmost area in Pannipitiya. Beyond here the area is under Hokandara. Maharagama-Vidyala junction (Route No-990), Maharagama-Hokandra (Route No-994 )Maharagama-Malabe (Route No-993), Kottawa-Malabe (Route No-336) but routes operate through Vidyala junction.
Poragodella - An area on the north to the Old Road (connects Kottawa Junction-Pannipitiya Junction). This area is adjacent to Mahalwarawa which is on the south of the Old Road.
Kottawa-Kiriwaththuduwa (Route No-128), Kottawa-Malabe (Route No-336), Rukmalagama-Pettah (Route No-138/3), Athurugiriya-Pettah (Route No-136,138/4) bus routes operate through this junction.
Katukurunda - An area to the north of Hatharaman handiya (Pola handiya) on the Malabe Road towards Vidyala junction. Maharagama-Katukurunda (Route No-996) and Kottawa-Malabe (Route No-336) buses operate through this area.
There are several middle class housing schemes built around Rukmalagama and this area is generally considered as a good residential area. Rukmalagama housing scheme has a small bus stand which operates buses to Colombo (Pettah) (Route No-138/3) through Kottawa. There are some Athurugiriya-Kottawa-Pettah (Route No-136,138/4) buses which run through Rukmalagama. This is the border of Pannipitiya area towards Athurugiriya. Beyond here the area is under Athurugiriya.
Malapalla - A junction (and nearby area) on the Kottawa-Homagama Old Road. Kottawa-Kiriwaththuduwa (Route No-128) buses operate through this area. This is the border of Pannipitiya area towards Homagama on the Old Road. The next area is called Galawilawaththa, which is under Homagama. Malapalla has a train station.
The Kottawa-Piliyandala Road starts from this junction. Kottawa-Mt.Lavinia (Route No-255), Kottawa-Piliyandala (Route No-296,342), Maharagama-Horana (Route No-280) bus routes operate through this junction.
Digana Road connects this junction to the Mahalwarawa junction and provides a shortcut access to the High Level Road (A4) from the Kottawa-Horana/Piliyandala Road. This is one of the southernmost parts of Pannipitiya. Area south of this is called Siddhamulla and it is a part of Piliyandala. From Kottawa, Mt.Lavinia (Route No-255) and Piliyandala (Route No-342,296) bus routes operate through Digana junction.
Mattegoda Junction - Although Mattegoda area is outside Pannipitiya (Mattegoda comes under Polgasowita) the junction which connects the Mattegoda area to the Kottawa-Horana Road is inside Pannipitiya area. Mattegoda is considered as a good residential area and there are several housing schemes built up in the neighbourhood. Mattegoda scheme has a small bus stand which operates buses to Colombo (Pettah) through Kottawa junction under the Route Number 138/2. Except for this Horana-Maharagama (Route No-280) buses also operate through Mattegoda junction. This is also one of the southernmost parts of Pannipitiya. Just south of Mattegoda junction is Mattegoda area and it is under Polgasowita.
Niyandagala/Dolekade/Hiripitiya - This area is to the south east of Kottawa town. It is to the south of Makumbura junction and to the east of Mattegoda junction. Can be accessed from Kottawa junction through Horana Road or by turning to the right from Makumbura junction on the High Level Road. Bus Route No 280 (Maharagama-Horana) operates through this area.
Brahmanagama - This is at the southeasternmost area of Pannipitiya and the far most area from the Pannipitiya junction. It is to the south-east of Niyandagala area. From here to the south is the Polgasowita area, to the south-east is Kiriwaththuduwa area and to the east is Diyagama which is under Homagama area. Bus Route No 280 (Maharagama-Horana) operates through this area. The E02 Expressway goes via this area.
 Rathmaldeniya - This area is situated towards Pelanwattha from the Kosgahahena junction on the Moraketiya-Erewwala road. The famous Doo Dharuwo house situated towards Pelanwaththa. Maharagama-Sikurada Pola (Route No-297) buses operate via Rathmaldeniya to Pelanwattha and then onward.

Various parts of Pannipitiya belongs to different manciple councils and "Pradesheeya Sabah" (The name for local authorities) such as Maharagama, Kasbawa, Homagama.

Pannipitiya Town
Pannipitiya Town is located alongside the High Level Road (A4) between the Maharagama and Kottawa. It is a mildly populated area.

Demographics
Most of the population in Pannipitiya are Sinhalese Buddhists

Important places around Pannipitiya
Dharmapala Vidyalaya, Pannipitiya
Parama Dhamma Viharaya, Pannipitiya
Sirasa/Shakthi media broadcasting center
Food & Nature (Pvt)Ltd

Public Transport

Rail

Pannipitiya has three stations located within its limits.
Pannipitiya station is located at the junction of Old Kottawa Rd and Borella Rd (Route 174). Pannipitiya flyover bridge continues above this station. 
Kottawa station is located 200m north of Kottawa junction
Malapalla

Bus

The main bus terminal for Pannipitiya is located at Kottawa.

Bus Routes heading through Pannipitiya:
99 - Colombo (Pettah) - Badulla - Passara - Welimada
69/122 - Maharagama - Kandy
122 – Pettah - Avissawella – Rathnapura - Embilipitiya - Rakwana - Suriyawewa
124 – Maharagama – Ihalabope
125 – Pettah – Maharagama – Padukka – Ingiriya
128/1 - Maharagama - Munamalewatta
138 - Pettah - Homagama
138/2 – Pettah - Mattegoda
138/3 – Pettah – Rukmalgama
138/4 – Pettah - Athurugiriya
280 – Maharagama - Horana
308 - Maharagama - Homagama
138/128 - Pettah - Thalagala
138/280 - Pettah - Diyagama
138/5 - Pettah - Mullegama
138 - Maharagama - Athurugiriya

Bus Routes terminating at Kottawa
Buses go via Athurugiriya Rd:
128 – Kiriwaththuduwa - Yakahaluwa - Thalagala (via Pola junction - Malapalla - Homagama Hospital)ï
336 – Malabe (via Pola junction) - Kottawa East - Wasalawatta - Liyanagoda - Vidyala junction - 
336/1 - Malabe(Via Horahena)
Buses go via Highlevel Rd:
129 – Moragahahena
138 – Pettah
Buses go via Piliyandala Rd:
255 – Mt.Lavinia
296 – Piliyandala
342 – Polgasovita - Piliyandala
174 – Borella

Bus Routes serving other areas of Pannipitiya but not Kottawa:
993 – Maharagama – Malabe
341 – Maharagama – Piliyandala
990 - Maharagama Vidyala Junction (via Pansala Junction / Dewram Vehera / Ambagas Hathara / Weera Mawatha)
212 - Maharagama - Erawwala (via Moraketiya junction)
996 - Maharagama - Katukurunda
994 - Maharagama - Hokandara
297 - Maharagama - Sikurada Pola

External links
Location
Areas in Pannipitiya

Populated places in Colombo District